Attention Scum was a 2001 television comedy series created by Simon Munnery and Stewart Lee. It starred Munnery as his "League Against Tedium" character and contained acerbic stand-up routines atop a transit van and sketches including mainstays such as "24 Hour News" (performed by Johnny Vegas), operatic intermissions by Kombat Opera, and two characters engaged in a duel over their hats.

Broadcast
Originally shown on BBC 2 at 11:50pm on Sundays from February to April 2001, the programme was not repeated on the BBC and only played on the now-defunct channel UK Play. In March 2001, it was nominated for a Golden Rose of Montreux although the BBC had already declined to fund a second series.

As of July 2017, there has not been an official DVD release.

History
The origin of the series lies in a 1994 cabaret act, Cluub Zarathustra, co-founded by Munnery and Lee, and performed at the Edinburgh Festival. Cluub Zarathustra was nominated for a Perrier Award in 1999. A never transmitted (or commissioned) TV pilot of Cluub Zarathustra for Channel 4 was filmed in 1996.

References

External links
 Comedy Guide

Guardian review and interview

BBC television comedy
2000s British comedy television series
2001 British television series debuts
2001 British television series endings
British surreal comedy television series